Akhtarabad Rural District is in Safadasht District of Malard County, Tehran province, Iran. At the National Census of 2006, its population (as a part of the former Malard District of Shahriar County) was 3,598 in 876 households. There were 3,166 inhabitants in 809 households at the following census of 2011, by which time the district had been separated from the county and Malard County established. At the most recent census of 2016, the population of the rural district was 2,576 in 784 households. The largest of its 52 villages was Akhtarabad, with 430 people.

References 

Malard County

Rural Districts of Tehran Province

Populated places in Tehran Province

Populated places in Malard County